Suragali Timothy Gnanananda Kavi (16 July 1922 – 6 January 2011) was an Indian poet from the state of Telangana.

Life and career 
Kavi was born in July 1922 in Hyderabad, Hyderabad State, Kavi is credited with forty anthologies which include Dharma Graham, Vamshadhara, Aksharabhisekham, Golconda Kavyam, Kristu Prabandham and Naajeevitha Gatha and has received Andhra Pradesh Sahitya Akademi award, Paidi Laxmaiah award and Andhra Pradesh Samskruthika Samstha Hamsa Award. A recipient of honorary doctorates from Andhra University in 1975 and Telugu University in 1999, he was honoured by the Government of India, in 2001, with the fourth highest Indian civilian award of Padma Shri. He died in Kakinada, Andhra Pradesh in January 2011 at the age of 88.

References

External links
 

1922 births
2011 deaths
20th-century Indian male writers
20th-century Indian poets
21st-century Indian male writers
21st-century Indian poets
Indian male poets
Poets from Andhra Pradesh
Recipients of the Kala Ratna
Recipients of the Padma Shri in literature & education
Writers from Hyderabad, India